National Highway 137A, commonly referred to as NH 137A is a national highway in  India. It is a spur road of National Highway 37. NH-137A traverses the state of Manipur in India.

Route 
Wahengbam Leikai(Junction of Imphal-Mayang Imphal road and NH 37), Hiyangthang, Wangol, Mayang Imphal, Wabagai, Kakching, Kakching Lamkhai.

Junctions  

  Terminal near Wahengbam Leikai.
  Terminal near Kakching Lamkhai.

See also 

 List of National Highways in India by highway number
 List of National Highways in India by state

References

External links 

 NH 137A on OpenStreetMap

National highways in India
National Highways in Manipur